Captain William Arthur Bond  (27 June 1889 – 22 July 1917) was a First World War flying ace credited with five aerial victories.

Bond was wounded while serving in the King's Own Yorkshire Light Infantry in the Dardanelles in 1916. After transferring to the Royal Flying Corps, Bond was posted to fly Nieuport fighters in No. 40 
Squadron in early 1917. He flew Nieuport No. B1545 to five victories in a month, beginning on 10 May and ending on 9 June 1917.

He was appointed flight commander in July. On the 22nd, he was killed in action over Sallaumines while flying Nieuport No. B1688. Cause of his death is disputed; he is said to have either fallen to the guns of a two-seater observation plane from FA 235, or to anti-aircraft fire.

After his death, his wife Aimee (later Aimée Stuart) wrote An Airman's Wife about him.

Honours and awards
24 June 1916 – Temp. 2nd Lt. William Arthur Bond, 1st Bn (attd 7th Bn.) Yorks. L.I. is awarded the Military Cross For conspicuous gallantry when on patrol. An enemy patrol was met and bombs were exchanged, one of which wounded both 2nd Lt. Bond and another officer, The enemy retired and opened machine-gun fire, which again wounded the other officer. 2nd Lt. Bond and Private Garnett at great risk brought him in over 200 yards under heavy machine-gun fire.
16 August 1917 – T./Lt. William Arthur Bond, MC, Yorks LI and RFC is awarded a bar to the Military Cross For conspicuous gallantry and devotion to duty. While on patrol he attacked at close range a hostile machine, which was sent down out of control. Shortly afterwards he attacked another, which stalled and fell sideways. On another date he flew over the lines at about 50 feet and attacked a hostile balloon, bringing it down in flames.

References
Nieuport Aces of World War 1. Norman Franks. Osprey Publishing, 2000. , .

Further reading
An Airman's Wife: A True Story of Lovers Separated by War. Aimee McHardy. Grub Street, 2007. , .
"Winged Warriors – Derbyshire Fighter Pilots in World War 1"  Barry M Marsden Ryestone Publications 2003 .

Source of information

1889 births
1917 deaths
King's Own Yorkshire Light Infantry officers
Royal Flying Corps officers
British World War I flying aces
British Army personnel of World War I
People from Chesterfield, Derbyshire
Recipients of the Military Cross
British military personnel killed in World War I
Military personnel from Derbyshire